In music, Op. 23 stands for Opus number 23. Compositions that are assigned this number include:

 Barber – Medea
 Beethoven – Violin Sonata No. 4
 Chopin – Ballade No. 1
 Dvořák – Piano Quartet No. 1
 Franck – Prélude, Aria et Final
 Gál – Das Lied der Nacht
 Grieg – Morning Mood
 Grieg – Peer Gynt
 Kabalevsky – Piano Concerto No. 2
 MacDowell – Piano Concerto No. 2
 Medea – Medea's Dance of Vengeance
 Myaskovsky – Symphony No. 6
 Rachmaninoff – Preludes, Op. 23
 Sarasate's Spanish Dances, Book III
 Schumann – Nachtstücke
 Scriabin – Piano Sonata No. 3
 Strauss – Macbeth
 Tchaikovsky – Piano Concerto No. 1